Pierre-Luc Caron (born August 26, 1993) is a former professional Canadian football long snapper who played for six seasons in the Canadian Football League (CFL) for the Calgary Stampeders and Montreal Alouettes.

Early life and education
Caron attended Kent School (class of 2012) in Kent, Connecticut.

University career
Caron played CIS football for the Laval Rouge et Or from 2012 to 2015.

Professional career

Calgary Stampeders
Caron was drafted by the Calgary Stampeders in the fifth round, 42nd overall, in the 2016 CFL Draft and signed with the team on May 23, 2016. He played in 71 regular season games with the Stampeders and was part of the 106th Grey Cup championship team in 2018. He did not play in 2020 due to the cancellation of the 2020 CFL season. He informed the Stampeders that he would not be re-signing with the club in 2021 due to his wife getting a job opportunity in Montreal.

Montreal Alouettes
On February 10, 2021, it was announced that Caron had signed with the Montreal Alouettes. He played for two seasons with the Alouettes before announcing his retirement on February, 10, 2023.

References

External links
Montreal Alouettes bio

1993 births
Living people
Calgary Stampeders players
Canadian football long snappers
Kent School alumni
Laval Rouge et Or football players
Montreal Alouettes players
Players of Canadian football from Quebec
Sportspeople from Laval, Quebec